Phanomorpha is a genus of moths of the family Crambidae.

Species
Phanomorpha acrocapna (Turner, 1915)
Phanomorpha anisophragma (Lower, 1901)
Phanomorpha dapsilis (Turner, 1908)
Phanomorpha drosera (Meyrick, 1887)
Phanomorpha icelomorpha (Turner, 1908)
Phanomorpha lichenopa (Lower, 1897)
Phanomorpha marmaropa (Meyrick, 1889)
Phanomorpha meliphyrta (Turner, 1908)
Phanomorpha mesogramma (Lower, 1900)
Phanomorpha orthogramma (Lower, 1902)
Phanomorpha pammicta (Turner, 1908)
Phanomorpha persumptana (Walker, 1863)
Phanomorpha schizodesma (Lower, 1899)
Phanomorpha semigilva (Turner, 1922)
Phanomorpha striatalis (Hampson, 1907)
Phanomorpha susanae (Lower, 1900)

References

Natural History Museum Lepidoptera genus database

Heliothelini
Crambidae genera
Taxa named by Alfred Jefferis Turner